Arunachalam Sabapathy (1853 – 1924) was a Ceylon Tamil newspaper editor, politician and member of the Legislative Council of Ceylon.

Early life and family
Sabapathy was born in 1853 in Thalaiyali near Vannarpannai in northern Ceylon. He was the son of Murugan Arunachalam and S. Annapillai. He was educated at Jaffna Central College.

Sabapathy married Sinnamma, daughter of Saravanamuthu Udayar and had two sons.

Career
Sabapathy was appointed to the Legislative Council of Ceylon on 9 January 1917 as the second Tamil member He was founder secretary and president of the Jaffna Association, a political organisation representing the Tamils of Jaffna. The Jaffna Association and Sabapathy were persuaded to join the Ceylon National Congress (CNC) after P. Arunachalam gave them assurances in 1918 that the Sinhalese leaders of the CNC would do all that they could do to secure "as large a representation as possible to the Tamils". The First Manning Reforms did not live up to the assurances given by the CNC and in 1921 Sabapathy joined the newly formed Tamil Mahajana Sabha as its vice-president.

Sabapathy a founding member of the Saiva Paripalana Sabhai and a member of the Jaffna Local Board. He was editor of the Hindu Organ for 34 years. He was one of the founders of Jaffna Hindu College and served as its manager from 1913 to 1924.

Death
Sabapathy died on 5 May 1924 at his home in Thalaiyali.

References

External links
 

1853 births
1924 deaths
Alumni of Jaffna Central College
Members of the Legislative Council of Ceylon
People associated with Jaffna Hindu College
People from Northern Province, Sri Lanka
Sri Lankan Tamil editors
Sri Lankan Tamil politicians